"Fake My Own Death" is the third track on Sum 41's sixth studio album 13 Voices, which was released on October 7, 2016.
The song was released as a promotional single as the first preview off the album along with an accompanying music video, on June 28, 2016, through Hopeless Records' official YouTube channel.

Music video
The song's music video was released through the Hopeless Records official YouTube channel, on June 28, 2016. It was directed by longtime collaborator Marc Klasfeld, who also directed the band's music videos for "Fat Lip", "In Too Deep", "We're All to Blame" and more.

The video features the band playing on a rooftop in Downtown Los Angeles, intercut with shots of the band escaping from popular internet memes, as well as internet public figures, that are attacking them, and then ultimately fighting them. Among the memes and public figures in the videos are the Nyan Cat, Kim Kardashian posing nude (from her 'Break the Internet' photo shoot for Paper magazine), Miley Cyrus on a Wrecking Ball, Sylvester Stallone as John Rambo, Angry Birds, Doge, Bill Cosby, Brad Pitt, Charlie Sheen, Sean Bean, Ben Affleck,  Donald Trump, Bernie Sanders, James Franco, Seth Rogen, Michael Jordan, Shia LaBeouf from his motivational video, a few Guitar Hero references (like Deryck Whibley playing a Guitar Hero game controller instead of his actual guitar for a few seconds), Trevor Philips from Grand Theft Auto V, Kermit the Frog, SpongeBob, Spider-Man and more. It is the first video by the band to feature the return of guitarist Dave Baksh and the first video not to feature former drummer Steve Jocz, who was replaced by Frank Zummo.

Live performances 
The song "Fake My Own Death"  was performed on The Late Show with Stephen Colbert on October 3, 2016.

Track listing

References

External links

Sum 41 songs
Music videos directed by Marc Klasfeld
2016 songs
Songs written by Deryck Whibley